Flight 1 or Flight 001 is an airline flight number that has had multiple accidents and incidents. It may refer to:

American Airways Flight 1 (1936), a Douglas DC-2 that crashed near Goodwin, Arkansas in 1936 en route from Memphis to Little Rock
TWA Flight 1, a Douglas DC-2 that crashed in Pennsylvania en route from Newark to Los Angeles in 1936
Northwest Airlines Flight 1, a Lockheed Super Electra that suffered a fire on board and crashed in Montana in 1939 coming from Minneapolis
American Airlines Flight 1 (1941), a Douglas DC-3 that crashed near Lawrence Station, Ontario in 1941 en route from Buffalo to Detroit
American Airlines Flight 1 (1962), a Boeing 707 that crashed after a rudder failure in 1962 just out of New York towards Los Angeles
 "Flight 1" (Mad Men), an episode of the television show Mad Men, centering in part on the American Airlines crash
CSA Flight 001, a flight that crashed in Czechoslovakia in 1976

Icelandic Airlines Flight 001, a Douglas DC-8 that crashed in Sri Lanka in 1978
Qantas Flight 1, a flight that overran the runway in Bangkok in 1999

See Also 
 List of flights with flight number 1 according to carrier.
 Flight 901
 Flight 191
 Flight 101

0001